In enzymology, a laminaribiose phosphorylase is an enzyme that catalyzes the chemical reaction

3-beta-D-glucosyl-D-glucose + phosphate  D-glucose + alpha-D-glucose 1-phosphate

Thus, the two substrates of this enzyme are 3-beta-D-glucosyl-D-glucose and phosphate, whereas its two products are D-glucose and alpha-D-glucose 1-phosphate.

This enzyme belongs to the family of glycosyltransferases, specifically the hexosyltransferases.  The systematic name of this enzyme class is 3-beta-D-glucosyl-D-glucose:phosphate alpha-D-glucosyltransferase.

References

 
 

EC 2.4.1
Enzymes of unknown structure